Alok Mittal is an Indian Police Service (IPS) officer. He was born in 1969 in Allahabad. Mittal is posted as Additional Director General of Police in Haryana. He served as Commissioner of Police, Gurgaon from February 2013 to November 2014 and worked as Inspector General for the National Investigation Agency in India from April 2015 to June 2020.

Early life 
He did his schooling from Balrampur and Gonda in Uttar Pradesh (UP).
Mittal earned a bachelor's degree in Mechanical Engineering from the Indian Institute of Technology Roorkee in 1990, and master's degree in Police Management from Osmania University, Hyderabad. He completed his LLB from MDU, Rohtak, Haryana and his Post Graduate Diploma in Cyber Laws (PGDCL) from NALSAR University of Law, Hyderabad.

Posts
He graduated as part of the 1993 batch, Haryana cadre. He served in many posts, including:
 SP Panchkula, December 1996 – October 1999 (2 years 11 months)
 SP CBI Economic Offences Wing & Cyber Crime Cell, Central Bureau of Investigation, New Delhi November 2001 – November 2005 (4 years)
 SSP Panipat, Haryana December 2005 – January 2007 (1 year 2 months). Mittal started the first Indian all-women PCR in Faridabad, Haryana in 2007. His public centric initiatives to improve policing in Gurgaon received wide appreciation from all sections of society.
 SSP Faridabad, Haryana January 2007 – June 2008 (1 year 6 months)
 SSP Rohtak, June 2008 – June 2009 (1 year 1 month)
 Joint Commissioner of Police, Gurgaon, June 2009 – October 2011 (2 years 5 months)
 Inspector General of Police, Rohtak Range, Haryana Police, October 2011 – February 2013 (1 year 5 months) Rohtak Area, India
 Commissoner of Police Gurgaon , Feb 2013- Nov 2014. He started the Cyber Safe Campaign in Gurgaon, along with Rakshit Tandon, a cyber security expert. It was conducted in two phases in July–August, 2013 and November, 2014 to educate students, teachers and parents in schools and colleges about the various problems related to cyber security. The campaign covered more than 60 schools and around 60,000 students and reached 4,000 teachers/parents. A summer internship program with the Cyber Crime Cell of Gurgaon Police was also started as part of the Cyber Safe Campaign, the campaign saw engineering and management graduates from various colleges/universities spread in all parts of the country.
 IGP Law & Order, Haryana Nov 2014-April 2015
 Inspector General, National Investigation Agency, April 2015-June 2020  (5 year 2 months) New Delhi, India

Recognition
 Indian Police Medal for Meritorious Service in 2009.
 President’s Police Medal for Distinguished Services in 2016.
 Unon Home Minister's  Asadharan Aasuchana Kushalata Padak 2021 for excellent intelligence service.

References 

Indian police chiefs